Gyrineum lacunatum is a species of predatory sea snail, a marine gastropod mollusc in the family Cymatiidae.

Distribution
This species occurs in the Indian Ocean off Madagascar; also off New Caledonia.

References

 Zhang. 2004. New records and newly identified species description of Tonnacea found in the Nansha Islands. Oceanologia et Limnologia Sinica 35(2) : 156-158
 Steyn, D.G & Lussi, M. (2005). Offshore Shells of Southern Africa: A pictorial guide to more than 750 Gastropods. Published by the authors. Pp. i–vi, 1–289.
 Liu, J.Y. [Ruiyu] (ed.). (2008). Checklist of marine biota of China seas. China Science Press. 1267 pp.
 Beu, A.G., 1998. Indo-West Pacific Ranellidae, Bursidae and Personidae (Mollusca: Gastropoda). A monograph of the New Caledonian fauna and revision of related taxa. Mémoires du Muséum national d'Histoire naturelle 178: 1-255

External links
 MNHN? Paris: specimen
 Iredale, T. (1936). Australian molluscan notes, no. 2. Records of the Australian Museum. 19(5): 267-340, pls 20-24

Cymatiidae
Gastropods described in 1845